Yeller may refer to:

someone who yell
Old Yeller, a novel by Fred Gipson
Old Yeller (1957 film), film based on Gipson's novel

See also 
 Yella (disambiguation)